Bear Feat is a 1949 Warner Bros. Looney Tunes cartoon directed by Chuck Jones and featuring The Three Bears. The short was completed in 1947 and released on December 10, 1949, and stars the Three Bears.

Plot
The cartoon begins with the Narrator introducing the three bears Papa Bear, Mama Bear And Junyer Bear. Junyer Bear is reading a Bugs Bunny comic on Papa Bear's newspaper and begins tickling him. Papa Bear manages to punch Junyer and slaps him in the face hard, causing Junyer Bear to land on his bowl of oatmeal. Papa Bear then yells him "Eat your oatmeal!" and continues reading his newspaper. Junyer Bear cries with oatmeal on his face, remarking "Pop! What I do?! What I do?!". Papa Bear notices something in the newspaper saying, "Wanted Trick bear act, Apply at Mingling Bros. Circus" and tells Mama and Junyer about. He tells them they need a little practice. Mama Bear tries to protest but Papa Bear yells, "Shut up and let's get going". Junyer is delighted and wants to be a trick bear act. He grabs Papa and begins to spin him like a beach ball. Mama Bear, who at first was hesitant, joins in singing, wearing a sport outfit. Junyer Bear lands Papa bear on Mama Bear's finger, still upside down. Papa tries to punch her, but misses, (or stopped himself from punching her) spins and makes an angry face at Junyer. He knows it's really his fault, so Papa kicks him in the butt and shakes in rage.

Papa Bear and Junyer Bear practice uni-cycling on a string which they tied on two trees. As they start pedaling their unicycles, Junyer's heavy weight makes them fall on the ground and bump into each other. Papa Bear yells him to get off the wire and calls him an "oversized freep head" which causes Junyer to get off the string sending Papa bear into the air with Junyer chasing him, telling he be a good bear and will not do bad and Papa Bear lands into their fireplace blackening him and he dazedly pedals towards Junyer. Junyer asks him if he's all right. Papa bear tries to punch him but he slips and falls on the floor before fainting with a shocked Junyer looking on. They proceed on the next act to swing and grab the next swing. Junyer does not grab Papa Bear until Papa screams "Grab me stupid!" which causes Junyer to pick him but falls to the ground as Papa Bear screams to let go of him, to which Junyer sends him into the branch knocking him out. Papa Bear is ready to make a hit on the white circle gong which is held by Mama Bear. Junyer sees this while eating cheese and is ready to hit only to crash each other. Junyer has his head on the board which reads "Hit my Baby son 25 cents for 3 shots", Papa bear throws a baseball at Junyer but it bounces back and hits him, which in turn, knocks him out. Mama Bear carries a couch chair for Papa Bear to land on and Junyer acts to land on the seesaw to send him into the air to land on the couch but he sends him into the sky and into outer space. They return to their house, giving the impression that Henry died after being sent into the air. The next day, they proceed to return to the exact spots they were at the previous day after Henry was launched, with Mama Bear holding the couch waiting for Papa Bear to land on, but he misses the couch and lands on the ground instead.

The next activity is a high diving act. Mama Bear begins playing the drums and Papa Bears dives to the pail of water. However, Junyer steps in eating salt crackers and drinks the pail of water making Papa Bear land on the empty pail. Junyer realizes this what he has done and calls Mama Bear to call for a doctor. Papa Bear proceeds the motorcycle race with Mama Bear holding the finish flag and asks her if she is ready and she replies and Papa Bear starts his motorcycle. Mama Bear swings the flag and watches the race. However, Junyer is eating a banana and throws the banana peel onto the track, causing Papa Bear to crash his motorcycle, injuring him (off screen). Papa Bear wakes up covered in bandages, and thinking that he and his family are ready as they'll ever be asks where the newspaper is. Mama Bear hands it to him and tries to protest, only to be silenced when he yells at her to shut up. Henry proceeds to check the address on the circus ad, but finds out that the newspaper was printed on April 16, 1928 and realizes that they are 21 years too late, because their calendar said August 1, 1949. Junyer jumps to Mama Bear in fear. Mama Bear says she tried to tell Henry. Papa Bear gets upset because he figures out that they have been practicing all for nothing. Unable to accept the reality of his blunder, he questions why he has such an abnormal family. He could not take anymore being a family and decided to escape his house and throws himself off a cliff. However, he lands in a pail of water set by Junyer, who tells him that he done a good thing, resulting in Papa Bear punching him which sends Junyer crying and remarking "What I do?! What I do?!" as the cartoon comes to an end.

Voice cast
Mel Blanc as Papa Bear's shout
Billy Bletcher as Papa Bear
Bea Benaderet as Mama Bear
Stan Freberg as the Narrator / Junyer Bear

Home media
Bear Feat is available uncut and restored on Disc 1 of Looney Tunes Golden Collection: Volume 6.

References

External links

 Entry at bcdb.com

1949 films
1949 animated films
1949 short films
Films set in 1949
Looney Tunes shorts
Short films directed by Chuck Jones
Warner Bros. short films
Warner Bros. Cartoons animated short films
Animated films about bears
Films scored by Carl Stalling
1940s Warner Bros. animated short films
Films about suicide
Films with screenplays by Michael Maltese
1940s English-language films